Robin Wood may refer to:

Robin Wood (artist) (1953–2021), Michigan-based fantasy artist
Robin Wood (Buffy the Vampire Slayer), character of the American TV show Buffy the Vampire Slayer
Robin Wood (comics) (1944–2021), Paraguayan comics writer
Robin Wood (critic) (1931–2009), British-Canadian film critic
Robin Wood (environmental organisation), German environmental advocacy group
Robin Wood, archaic name for Robin Hood

See also
 Robin Woods (1914–1997), English dean